Cru was an American hip hop group formally signed to Def Jam Recordings composed of three members, The One Chadio, Mighty Ha and Yogi. The group's first appearance was the "We Got It Goin' On" remix by R&B group Changing Faces in 1995. Two years later the group released their debut album, Da Dirty 30, which featured two singles "Just Another Case" and "Bubblin'". After the release of the album, the group disbanded with Yogi becoming a hip hop producer when he joined Puffy Combs's Hitmen Production Team. After a long hiatus, The One Chadio resumed his career as a solo artist releasing an album titled Internal Insurgency and soon thereafter releasing an album titled External Insurgency. In an online interview, The One Chadio said he is currently working on another project that is tentatively set to be released in the latter half of 2022.

Discography

Studio album

Singles

References

Def Jam Recordings artists
Hip hop groups from New York City
Musical groups established in 1995
Musical groups disestablished in 1997
American musical trios
Rappers from the Bronx
1995 establishments in New York City
1997 disestablishments in New York (state)
East Coast hip hop groups
African-American musical groups
Musical groups from the Bronx